Henry W. Blair (1834–1920) was a U.S. Senator from New Hampshire from 1879 to 1891. Senator Blair may also refer to:

Austin Blair (1818–1894), Michigan State Senate
Craig Blair (born 1959), West Virginia State Senate
Francis Preston Blair Jr. (1821–1875), Missouri State Senate
John Blair (Tennessee politician) (1790–1863), Tennessee State Senate
William Blair (American politician) (1820–1880), Wisconsin State Senate